Allojapyx is a genus of diplurans in the family Japygidae.

Species
 Allojapyx allodontus (Silvestri, 1911)

References

Diplura